Jérémy Hénin (born 12 November 1977) is a French retired professional footballer who played as a defender.

Career
Born in Harfleur, Seine-Maritime, Hénin began his career with Le Havre, debuting on 8 March 1997 in the 1–0 Ligue 1 win at Lens.

He moved to Sedan in 2004, when the club was in Ligue 2, making his club debut in the 3–0 win against Guingamp on 16 August 2004. Hénin missed just six league games in his first two seasons at Sedan, with the club winning promotion in 2006. He returned to Le Havre in January 2007, where he would win Ligue 2 in 2008.

References

External links

1977 births
Living people
People from Harfleur
Association football defenders
French footballers
Le Havre AC players
CS Sedan Ardennes players
Angers SCO players
Ligue 1 players
Ligue 2 players
Sportspeople from Seine-Maritime
Footballers from Normandy